The Tsez (also known as the Dido or the Didoi) are a North Caucasian ethnic group. Their unwritten language, also called Tsez or Dido, belongs to the Northeast Caucasian group with some 15,354 speakers.  For demographic purposes, today they are classified with the Avars with whom the Tsez share a religion, Sunni Islam, and some cultural traits. They are centered at the Tsunta district of the Republic of Dagestan, Russia. The term “Dido” is sometimes used in a broader sense to refer to the Tsez as well as the Bezhtas, Hinukhs, Khwarshis and Hunzibs, which are also categorized as Avar subgroups. According to the 2002 Russian census, there were 15,256 self-identified Tsez in Russia (15,176 in their homeland), notated as an "Avar subgroup", though the real number is probably slightly greater.

Culture 
The Tsez traditionally engaged in raising livestock and limited cultivation. In more recent times, some Tsez have migrate to industrial centers for work. The Tsez adhere to Sunni Islam. Islam became the majority faith of the Tsez by the 17th and 18th centuries though elements of pre-Islamic customs are still present.

References

 

Ethnic groups in Dagestan
Muslim communities of Russia
Peoples of the Caucasus
Muslim communities of the Caucasus